The Mandingo Wars were a series of conflicts from 1883 to 1898 between France and the Wassoulou Empire of the Mandingo people led by Samori Ture. The French were ultimately triumphant and established dominance over the Ivory Coast.

First Mandingo War (1883–1886)
Samory opposed French ambitions to build an empire in West Africa. He went to war with the French in 1883. French troops occupied Bamako on the Niger River and settled the war after a successful offensive in 1886. Samory was forced to accept the Niger as his frontier.

Second Mandingo War (1894–95)
Samory defeated the French, putting an end to the Ivory Coast protectorate.

Third Mandingo War (1898)
Samory led an attack on the Kong Empire, a French ally, and burned down the capital city of Kong. Afterwards, the final and decisive struggle in the Mandingo Wars saw French forces victorious over Samory, who was captured and sent into exile.

Wars involving France
19th century in Africa
Battles involving the French Foreign Legion
African resistance to colonialism
Resistance to the French colonial empire